The Robert and Suzanne Drucker House is an architecturally significant house in Wilmette, Illinois, United States. It was designed by architect Harry Weese for his sister Sue Drucker and her husband Robert. Brother Ben Weese designed an addition in 1963.

History
Sue (née Weese) Drucker was the younger sister of architect Harry Weese. In 1952, she and her husband Robert Drucker were living with their three children in an Evanston, Illinois apartment when they decided that they wanted to have a house. Her brother Harry Weese was an architect who started his own practice in 1947 following World War II. They chose to stay in the vicinity, selecting a site in nearby Wilmette, Illinois by her mother. Construction took much longer than expected, as Harry had to fire his contractor halfway through the project. The house was completed in 1954.

Because Harry Weese was close with his family, he had a good idea of what Sue was looking for in a home. He designed the house to have many windows on the south so that it would always be filled with sunlight during the day. Although it is generally an open floor plan, rooms could also be closed off with accordion doors for privacy. In lieu of garage—which Harry saw only as a storage building—Weese designed a carport with storage cabinets. In 1963, Harry and Sue's brother Ben Weese designed a second-floor wing with three bedrooms. As of September 2013, the Drucker family still resides in the house.

Architecture
The Robert and Suzanne Drucker House is in the Indian Hills Subdivision of Wilmette. It is on the south side of Iroquois Street halfway between Illinois Road to the east and Hibbard Road to the west. The house stands out on its block, which is otherwise filled with standard historical revival homes. It is situated on a deep rectangular  lot with a fenced rear yard. The house sits  back from Iroquois Street. The two-story house is generally L-shaped with its long portion parallel to Iroquois and its wing extension on the west. Typical of the International Style, the house lacks excess ornamentation. Roofs are flat, covered with tar and gravel, and edged with aluminum. Exterior walls are painted vertical board-and-batten cedar siting. Doors and windows have painted metal frames. The carport, porches, and terrace have wood privacy walls.

The main section of the house measures . Originally one story, the Druckers commissioned a second-story addition on the main section in 1963. The front porch and terrace, extending  from the house, stretch  along the front of the house. To the west of the porch and terrace is the  carport. The rear of the house features a  screened-in porch with a flat roof and a simple wooden cornice. A small terrace fits between the porch and the western wing of the house.

References

Houses completed in 1954
Buildings and structures in Wilmette, Illinois
Houses on the National Register of Historic Places in Cook County, Illinois
Harry Weese buildings
1950s architecture in the United States
International style architecture in Illinois
Modernist architecture in Illinois